Ri Myong-su (born on 20 February 1934 in Myongchon, North Hamgyong) is the former chief of General Staff of the Korean People's Army from 2016 to 2018.

Ri was a confidant and military aide of the former North Korean leader Kim Jong-il. He was appointed the head of the Ministry of People's Security by Kim Jong-il in April 2011 and served in that role until removed from power by Kim Jong-un in February 2013. He was replaced by Choe Pu-il.

He was made chief of General Staff of the Korean People's Army in February 2016 and promoted to vice marshal rank in April that year.

In June 2018, it was announced that he had been sacked about a week before the summit between North Korea and the United States, and was replaced in the position by his deputy Ri Yong-gil.

See also
Rimyongsu Sports Club

References

Law enforcement in North Korea
Government ministers of North Korea
People from Myongchon County
North Korean military personnel
1937 births
Living people